Patrick Cummins may refer to:

Pat Cummins (born 1993), Australian international cricketer
Patrick Cummins (fighter) (born 1980), American mixed martial artist
Patrick Cummins (politician) (1921–2009), Irish politician
Patrick Cummins (piper), Irish piper and tutor

See also
Pat Cummings (disambiguation)